Fui Sha Wai may refer to:
 Fui Sha Wai (Tai Po District), a village in Tai Hang, Tai Po District, Hong Kong
 Fui Sha Wai (Yuen Long District), a village in Yuen Long District, Hong Kong